Boarnsterhim was a municipality in the northern Netherlands. On 1 January 2014, the municipality was dissolved and its territory was split between four other municipalities: De Friese Meren, which was established that day, Leeuwarden, Heerenveen and Súdwest-Fryslân.

Population centres 

Akkrum, Aldeboarn (Oldeboorn), Dearsum (Deersum), Eagum (Aegum), Friens, Grou (Grouw), Idaerd (Idaard), Jirnsum (Irnsum), Nes, Poppenwier (Poppingawier), Raerd (Rauwerd), Reduzum (Roordahuizum), Sibrandabuorren (Sijbrandaburen), Terherne (Terhorne), Tersoal (Terzool), Warstiens, Warten (Wartena), Wergea (Warga).

(Dutch names)

Transportation

Railway stations  
 Akkrum
 Grou-Jirnsum

Attractions
Aquaverium

References

External links 

Former municipalities of Friesland
1984 establishments in the Netherlands
States and territories established in 1984
Municipalities of the Netherlands disestablished in 2014
De Fryske Marren
Heerenveen
Leeuwarden
Súdwest-Fryslân